Øystein Hauge (born 10 December 1956 in Vegårshei, Aust-Agder) is a Norwegian writer.

He hails from Vegårshei. He debuted in 1989 with the poetry collection Messe og maskespel .

Outside of literature, he has worked as a civil servant in the Ministry of Justice and the Compulsory Civilian National Service Administration.

References

1956 births
Living people
People from Vegårshei
Nynorsk-language writers
20th-century Norwegian poets
Norwegian male poets
People from Fræna
Norwegian civil servants
20th-century Norwegian male writers